John Peers and Filip Polášek defeated Aslan Karatsev and Andrey Rublev in the final, 6–3, 7–6(7–5) to win the men's doubles tennis title at the 2021 Indian Wells Masters.

Nikola Mektić and Horacio Zeballos were the reigning champions from when the tournament was last held in 2019, but chose to compete with different partners. Mektić played alongside Mate Pavić, but lost to Peers and Polášek in the quarterfinals. Zeballos played alongside Marcel Granollers, but lost to Fabio Fognini and Lorenzo Sonego in the first round.

Mektić usurped his doubles partner Pavić for the ATP No. 1 doubles ranking after the event, as the latter dropped points related to the 2019 Shanghai Masters.

Seeds

Draw

Finals

Top half

Bottom half

References

External Links
 Main Draw

BNP Paribas Open – Men's Doubles
Doubles men